John Malkin (9 November 1921 – 19 May 1994) was an English footballer who played in the Football League for Stoke City.

Career
Malkin was born in Stoke-on-Trent and was spotted by scouts in 1942 playing football in the Army and was signed by his local club Stoke City. Malkin was a winger who had the daunting task of replacing the role of Stanley Matthews in the number 7 shirt, after he joined Blackpool in 1947. He made his debut against Everton in March 1948 but didn't become a regular first team player until the 1949–50 season where he made 29 appearances. Injury kept Malkin out for most of the 1950–51 season but he did make a return for the poor 1951–52 and 1952–53 campaigns which saw Stoke relegated to the Second Division. He scored 11 goals in 42 matches in 1953–54 his best performance in his career and spent two more season in the squad before retiring due to injury. He also enjoyed a brief spell as coach for Stoke City following his injury.

After football
After leaving competitive football, Malkin started work for the Royal Mail. In 1994 Malkin died of cancer.

Career statistics
Source:

References

English footballers
Stoke City F.C. players
English Football League players
1920s births
1994 deaths
Association football wingers